Anthony Lawrence Cohen (4 June 19572 August 2017) was an Australian music record producer and sound engineer. He worked with Nick Cave's groups the Birthday Party, and then the Bad Seeds from 1979 to 2001. In mid-1986 he had followed Cave to London and then onto Berlin, in January 1987, to continue to work on their material. At the ARIA Music Awards of 1994 Cohen won Producer of the Year for The Cruel Sea's second album, The Honeymoon Is Over (May 1993). At the 1995 ceremony he won Producer of the Year and Engineer of the Year for the Cruel Sea's Three Legged Dog. Cohen had been a long-term alcohol and drug user, his health deteriorated in the 2010s and he died in 2017 at Dandenong Hospital, aged 60. In November 2017 he was posthumously inducted into the Music Victoria Hall of Fame.

Biography 

Anthony Lawrence Cohen was born on 4 June 1957 in Melbourne. His father, Philip Cohen, was an Australian son of Jewish migrants from Manchester, Philip had converted to Roman Catholicism before marrying Margaret, who was an Australian of Irish descent. He grew up in suburban East Ringwood where he attended St Francis de Sales Primary School. The family moved to Mentone with a younger sibling, where Cohen was enrolled at St Bede's College for his secondary education. While at Bede's he started taking drugs including marijuana/hash, amytal and LSD, which adversely affected his academic progress. Cohen started to play the drums when the family had moved to the neighbouring suburb of Cheltenham and formed a friendship with fellow aspiring drummer, Chris Thompson. He later recalled, "Neither of us were very good drummers I might admit but we shared a mutual love of music and playing."

Cohen, aged 15, joined a rock, glam rock band Epitaph on drums for a year. He bought a four-track recorder to tape their work and then recorded other local groups. During school holidays in mid-1973 he spent two weeks doing work experience at Armstrong Studios. His friend Thompson went along for a day and both decided on a career in the recording studio. After work experience he refused to return to school but continued at the studios, "No one said anything, so I stayed." For two years he was a "shit-kicker", and started by, "cleaning the toilets and getting the lunches and stuff, and then got promoted to mono dubbing boy." By 1975 Cohen began working as a sound engineer under the guidance of Roger Savage. In April of the following year he was working as an assistant record producer, alongside Molly Meldrum, on Perth's glam rock group, Supernaut's lead single, "I Like It Both Ways" (May 1976). Cohen produced the group's associated self-titled album, which appeared in November of that year, and its follow-up single, "Too Hot to Touch" (September).

In July 1976 Cohen and fellow engineer, Ian MacKenzie, met with Meldrum to organise the production of pop group, the Ferrets' debut album, Dreams of a Love: "It was all a bit of Elton John, a bit of the 'Real Thing', [Meldrum] called us in for a production meeting 9:00 in the morning at his place and he was still in bed [...] and putting the music on [...] very, very loud and then proceeds to shout at you over the top of it, and we were all sitting there sort of terrified thinking, what on earth is he saying?" After a year production was still incomplete so the Ferrets took over, together with Cohen and MacKenzie assisting. It was finalised in August 1977 and released in October with Meldrum credited as Willie Everfinish.

In June 1978 Cohen started working with the Boys Next Door (later renamed the Birthday Party), as engineer at Richmond Recorders on their debut album, Door, Door (1979). He then engineered the Birthday Party's early extended play, Hee Haw (December 1979). Next he was the engineer and producer, on their second album, The Birthday Party (November 1980). He was engineer and producer for their third album, Junkyard (May 1982), which was listed in the book, 100 Best Australian Albums at number 17. Cohen told the authors that he was directed, "Forget all the bottom end and the rich, lush sounds. Make it sound like trash." He continued as engineer and/or producer for the group's leader, Nick Cave, in the related group, Nick Cave and the Bad Seeds. From From Her to Eternity (18 June 1984) to No More Shall We Part (2 April 2001). Cohen followed the group to London in mid-1986 and then on to Berlin in January 1987 to continue to work with Cave. He returned to Melbourne in January 1988 with his drug habit "spiraling out of control."

Cohen reflected on his early work with Cave, in an interview with Richard Fidler in September 2006, "[it] was all very experimental then, because we were all learning – I fell in love with this new way of recording... because there were no rules. We were looking for sounds that made your fillings drop out rather than pleasant pop tunes, so we got to do crazy things like find concrete stairwells and abuse equipment, so it was all very attractive for me. Some of it didn't work, but as history has shown Nick really honed his craft, he's done some brilliant records... some of the early stuff was a bit rough but it was a learning curve then." Ed Nimmervoll, an Australian music journalist and editor of Rock Australia Magazine, recalled "Nick Cave's Birthday Party were allowed to take up some of the studio time slack. Rather than [go] home, their producer Tony Cohen slept in the air conditioning duct."

A long-term working relationship had also been established with Tex Perkins, starting with the singer's alternative rock group, Beasts of Bourbon's 1984 album, The Axeman's Jazz. Cohen had engineered and produced it during a single eight-hour session at Paradise Studios in Sydney, in October of the previous year, with label boss Roger Grierson as executive producer. According to Australian musicologist, Ian McFarlane, "Legend has it that the session was fuelled by 72 cans of beer and one bottle of Scotch, and that it only ended when the band members began passing out!" He produced their next studio album, The Low Road, (December 1991). In the following year he was their engineer, producer and mixer for a five-track EP, Just Right, which had been recorded live at the Prince of Wales Hotel in May 1991 by Cohen's childhood friend, Chris Thompson.

Cohen's services were used for Perkins' next band the Cruel Sea on their second studio album, This Is Not the Way Home (October 1991). He was nominated at the ARIA Music Awards of 1993 for Producer of the Year for that album and for "Get Thee to a Nunnery", a track on TISM's EP, The Beasts of Suburban (20 July 1992). He worked for an ad hoc country blues trio of Perkins, Don Walker and Charlie Owen, as Tex, Don and Charlie on their debut album, Sad But True (November 1993). While recording that album he was interviewed in the studio by Kerry Negara, the director of SBS-TV's Nomad. At the following year's ARIA Awards ceremony he won Producer of the Year for the Cruel Sea's third album, The Honeymoon Is Over (May 1993).

In 1995 he won both Engineer of the Year and Producer of the Year. Over the previous 18 months – the eligibility period – Cohen had produced Let Love In (Nick Cave and the Bad Seeds, 18 April 1994), You Wanna Be There But You Don't Wanna Travel (Dave Graney 'n' the Coral Snakes, June 1994), Parables for Wooden Ears (Powderfinger, 18 July 1994), Livin' Lazy (Maurice Frawley and Working Class Ringos, 1994), Three Legged Dog (the Cruel Sea, April 1995), Kim Salmon and the Surrealists (Kim Salmon and the Surrealists, April 1995) and Mouth to Mouth (the Blackeyed Susans, July 1995).

In the 2000s Cohen's name started appearing less regularly on album credits. During 2003 he worked as a remix engineer on Nick Cave and the Bad Seeds' old master tapes for Stephen Petronio's contemporary dance work, Underland. Cave was unable to provide new tracks for the project due to time conflicts but allowed his material to be used. Cohen had effectively retired in 2004–2005. He emerged in 2017 to produce Augie March's album Bootikins, as he had always wanted to work with the group. He died unexpectedly before the album's sessions concluded, and Augie March leader Glenn Richards stated "It still amazes me that we got a chance to work with the man. The moments are ours and we will cherish them ... He got us feeling like and playing like a real band again after a long interim, and we made some very good music together." In November 2017 Cohen was posthumously inducted into the Music Victoria Hall of Fame.

Personal life 

Tony Cohen had an on-again off-again relationship with Joanne from mid-1981, she had been Chris Thompson's girlfriend when they met. They lived together initially in Elsternwick, then Sydney and back, again. His drug habit now included amphetamine and heroin. By early 1983 Cohen was also dating a different woman, Josephine, whom he married on 28 May 1983, in Melbourne. According to his sibling, "I don't think Tony ever had a distinct line between dumping one girl and getting on with another." The couple moved to Sydney in late 1983 and then back to Melbourne in July of the following year. Cohen and Josephine relocated to London in mid-1986 before they separated (and later divorced). He then moved to Berlin in January 1987, and returned to Australian early in the next year.

Early in 1991 Cohen began a relationship with Astrid Munday, a vocalist for country music groups Killer Sheep and then Desert Boot. After living together in Sydney they moved in with Cohen's parents at their rural property at Kongwak, Victoria in November 1991. At different times he attempted to curb his alcohol and drug dependencies. The couple returned to Melbourne in February 1992. Cohen had earlier been diagnosed with hepatitis C, then pancreatitis (September 1992) and diabetes (October). At the ARIA Music Awards of 1995 he had a hypoglycaemic event, "just as they announced my name so I was in the suit and everything and sweat was just dripping off me so I had to go and hide up the back and Molly was standing on the seat going 'Where are you? Tony, where are you?' So it wasn't a great memory for me... I couldn't get up on stage and make a speech... you know, my blood sugar had dropped and I was a mess; such a shame."

In late 2000 Cohen and Munday moved to London, where he worked on No More Shall We Part (April 2001) for Nick Cave and the Bad Seeds, while Munday worked as a temporary teacher. By that stage Cohen's diabetes was worsening and his studio attendances became erratic. After the recording sessions ended he struggled to get further work in London and so returned to Melbourne. By 2004 or 2005 he was in semi-retirement, "In a bid to rid himself of a renewed taste for drugs and to revive his ailing health."

His health continued to deteriorate into the 2010s. Tony Cohen died on 2 August 2017 at Dandenong Hospital, aged 60. Although no cause of death was reported, his sibling recalled, "Tony lived a hard life with drugs and alcohol playing a big part of his professional career. He did give them up many years ago but always knew that he would eventually pay for his 'sins'." Conversely, "we were like chalk and cheese. But, I loved him and fully respect what he achieved in his career. He was technically brilliant, but also a caring, big-hearted man." Upon the inclusion of Cohen's work in the Australian Music Vault, his mother Margaret stated, "it wasn't until his untimely death, that I was made aware of the esteem that he was held in by so many people. I am proud of his contribution to the rock and roll music industry here and all that he achieved through his life." A suitcase of cassette tapes he used as back-ups of recordings was donated to the vault. Munday released an album with material dedicated to her husband, Beauty in the Ordinary, in August 2020.

Technical works 

List of technical works by Tony Cohen including audio engineer, record producer or mixer.

Awards and nominations 

Four albums which Cohen worked on are listed in the book, 100 Best Australian Albums (2010): the Birthday Party's Junkyard (May 1982) at No. 17, the Cruel Sea's The Honeymoon Is Over (May 1993) at No. 63, Nick Cave and the Bad Seeds' Tender Prey (September 1988) at No. 83, and Tex, Don and Charlie's Sad But True (November 1993) at No. 84.

ARIA Music Awards 

! 
|-
| 1993 || The Cruel Sea – This Is Not the Way Home TISM – "Get Thee to a Nunnery || Producer of the Year ||  || 
|-
| 1994 || The Cruel Sea – The Honeymoon Is Over || Producer of the Year ||  || 
|-
| rowspan="2"|1995 || himself, Paul McKercher – The Cruel Sea – Three Legged Dog || Engineer of the Year ||  || 
|-
| himself – The Cruel Sea – Three Legged Dog || Producer of the Year ||  || 
|-

Music Victoria Awards
The Music Victoria Awards are an annual awards night celebrating Victorian music. They commenced in 2006.

! 
|-
| Music Victoria Awards of 2017
| Tony Cohen
| Hall of Fame
| 
| 
|-

References

External links
 "Tony Cohen – A Tribute to an Australian Rock Music Legend" podcast by Richard Dinnen, broadcast on 8 August 2017, archived on 4 March 2019, accessed on 20 November 2020.

ARIA Award winners
Australian audio engineers
Australian record producers
1957 births
2017 deaths
Musicians from Melbourne
Australian people of Irish descent
Australian expatriates in Germany
Australian people of English-Jewish descent
People from Ringwood, Victoria
People from Cheltenham, Victoria